The 2011 Nashville mayoral election took place on August 4, 2011, and elected the mayor of the Metropolitan Government of Nashville and Davidson County. It saw the reelection of Karl Dean, won the election outright in the first round, eliminating the need for a runoff.

Results

References

2011 Tennessee elections
2011 United States mayoral elections
2011
August 2011 events in the United States